Alexander Jerome "Sliv" Nemzek (October 11, 1895 – May 29, 1958) was an American college football and baseball player and coach. He served as the head football coach at Minnesota State University–Moorhead in 1919 and again from 1923 to 1940.

References

External links
 

1895 births
1958 deaths
Minnesota State–Moorhead Dragons athletic directors
Minnesota State–Moorhead Dragons football coaches
North Dakota State Bison baseball players
North Dakota State Bison football coaches
North Dakota State Bison football players
People from Moorhead, Minnesota